Ni is the Mandarin pinyin and Wade–Giles romanization of the Chinese surname written  in Chinese character. It is romanized Ngai in Cantonese. It is romanized as "Geh" in Malaysia and Singapore, and "Ge" in Indonesia, from its Minnan / Hokkian pronunciation. Ni is listed 71st in the Song dynasty classic text Hundred Family Surnames. As of 2008, it is the 116th most common surname in China, shared by 1.4 million people.

Notable people
 Ni Bian or Ni Shui (倪说, 3rd century BC), Warring States period diplomat from the state of Song
 Ni Kuan (倪寬; died 103 BC), Western Han dynasty minister
 Ni Shu (9th – 10th century), Southern Han chancellor
 Ni Wenjun (died 1357), general of the Red Turban Rebellion
 Ni Zan (1301–1374), painter, one of the Four Masters of the Yuan dynasty
 Ni Yuanlu (1593–1644), Ming dynasty official and painter
 Ni Xiangkai (倪象愷; fl. 1720s–30s), Qing dynasty Governor of Taiwan prefecture
 Ni Wenwei (倪文蔚; 1823–1890), Qing dynasty Governor of Guangxi and Henan provinces
 Ni Sichong (1868–1924), warlord of the Anhui clique
 Ni Guizhen (倪桂珍; 1869–1931), matriarch of the Soong family, mother of Soong Ching-ling, Soong Mei-ling, and T. V. Soong
 Ni Daolang (1879–1952), Governor of Anhui of the Wang Jingwei regime, executed for treason
 Ni Yingdian (倪映典; 1885–1910), anti-Qing revolutionary leader, posthumously awarded rank of General
 Ni Baochun (倪葆春; 1899–1997), physician, President of St. John's University, Shanghai
 Ni Zhiliang (1900–1965), PLA lieutenant general, first Chinese ambassador to North Korea
 Watchman Nee or Ni Tuosheng (1903–1972), Christian leader
 Ni Wen-ya (1903–2006), President of the Legislative Yuan of the Republic of China
 Ni Chao (倪超; 1907–1996), civil engineer, President of National Cheng Kung University
 Ngai Shiu-kit (born 1924), Hong Kong legislator
 Ni Weidou (born 1932), scientist, former Vice-President of Tsinghua University
 Ni Zhifu (1933–2013), politician, Politburo member
 Ni Xiance (born 1935), former Governor of Jiangxi province, convicted of corruption
 Ni Kuang (born 1935), Hong Kong novelist
 Ni Tianzeng (倪天增; 1937–1992), Vice Mayor of Shanghai
 Ni Zhiqin (born 1942), Chinese high jumper who broke the world record
 Ni Wei-Tou (born 1944), Taiwanese physicist
 Siu Yam-yam or Ni Xiaoyan (born 1945), Hong Kong actress
 Yi Shu or Ni Yishu (born 1946), Hong Kong novelist, sister of Ni Kuang
 Ni Min-jan (1946–2005), Taiwanese actor
 Fang Ying or Ni Fangning (方盈; 1948–2010), Hong Kong actress
 Ni Fake (born 1954), former Vice Governor of Anhui province
 Ni Ping (born 1959), actress and television presenter
 Ni Yulan (born 1960), civil rights lawyer
 Ngeh Koo Ham or Ni Kehan ((倪可汉); born 1961), Malaysian politician, member of the Malaysian Parliament
 Ni Xialian (born 1963), female table tennis player, world champion
 Nga Kor Ming or Ni Kemin (倪可敏; born 1972), Malaysian politician, Perak State Legislative Assembly
 Shunza or Ni Shunzi (born 1973), singer-songwriter
 Fu-Te Ni or Ni Fude (born 1982), Taiwanese baseball player
 Ni Hua (born 1983), chess grandmaster
 Ni Hong (born 1986), female fencer, Olympic medalist
 Ni Ni (born 1988), actress
 Ni Bo (born 1989), football player
 Ni Yusong (born 1991), football player

See also
 Ngai (surname)

References

Chinese-language surnames
Multiple Chinese surnames

Individual Chinese surnames